The SkiWelt is Austria's largest interconnected ski area. It has 90 Cable car lifts and Ski lifts, 280 Kilometers (173 Miles) of Ski Pistes, and 77 Ski Huts. The member villages are: Brixen im Thale, Ellmau, Going, Hopfgarten, Itter, Kelchsau, Scheffau, Söll and Westendorf.

Lifts
There are:

15 Cable cars

18 Detachable chairlifts

18 Chairlifts

19 Drag lifts

20 Practice lifts

As of 2018-19 season, these are all of the current ski lifts.

History

1946	Establishment of the Westendorf Ski Lifts, the oldest company in the SkiWelt. They experienced serious difficulties in the postwar years concerning the construction costs and the amount of materials determined by the authorities

1947	Establishment of the Hopfgarten Ski Lifts. The longest chairlift in Europe (2,830m) was built in 1954, however the top station and two supports were destroyed by an avalanche.

1948	Construction of the "Alpenrosenlift" - then Austria's biggest ski lift (2,205m long) 
In the winter of 1948/49, a total of 22,289 winter sports enthusiasts were transported

1950-1960

1952	Establishment of a ski school in Westendorf

1954	Installation of the "Stricklift" drag lift in Westendorf

1959	Establishment of the Söll Ski Lifts and construction of the "Angeralm" drag lift

1960-1970

1960	The "Stricklift" drag lift was converted into a double T-bar

1961	Construction of the "Zieplhöfe" drag lift in Westendorf

1962	Establishment of the Scheffau ski lift company (Schilift Scheffau am Wilden Kaiser GesmbH) by 66 citizens of Scheffau.

1964	Construction of the "Kandleralm" drag lift in Brixen

1965	Construction of the Söll-Hochsöll single chairlift and the Hochsöll drag lift

1966	Hopfgarten buys its first "Ratrak" snow groomer
Construction of the "Salvenmoos" drag lift in Hopfgarten

1967	Construction of the "Knolln" drag lift

1968	Transportation of the 2,000,000th passenger on the Hohe Salve lift
Construction of the "Stöckl" drag lift in Söll

1969	Construction of the "Taklaser" drag lift and the "Alpenrose II" single chair lift in Westendorf
Chairlift at SkiWelt Hopfgarten
Chairlift at SkiWelt Hopfgarten

1970-1980

1970	Establishment of the development company "Erschließungsgesellschaft Ellmau GmbH", Construction of the "Sonnberg" lifts in Brixen
Construction of the single chair lift on the Hohe Salve in Söll

1971	Construction of the "Hartkaiserbahn" funicular in Ellmau
Establishment of the Scheffau Lift Company (Bergbahn Scheffau am Wilder Kaiser GesmbH)
Westendorf Lift Company holds a third of the company.

1971/72	First billing for travel between Hopfgarten and Söll. No adjustment payments made
Construction of the "Rinner" drag lift in Söll

1972	Opening of the "Hartkaiserbahn" funicular in Ellmau
Construction of the "Alpenrose 1B" chairlift in Westendorf
Construction of the double chairlift "Scheffau – Brandstadl" section I and section II, Construction of the temporary mountain restaurant, construction of the "Ostlift", construction of the "Eiberglift"

1972/73	Weekly ticket valid between Scheffau and Ellmau

1973	Construction of the "Laubkogel" drag lift in Westendorf
Construction of the "Aualmlift" in Scheffau

1973/74	Tickets valid between Scheffau and Brixen – individual tickets paid in cash, with account settlement

1974	Introduction of a 7-day greater-area ski pass valid at Brixen im Thale, Ellmau, Going, Hopfgarten, Itter, Scheffau and Söll, no offsetting

1975	Construction of the "Fleiding" chairlift in Westendorf
Construction of the Söll-Hochsoll double chairlift
Construction of the "Südlift", Construction of the "Weissachlift", Construction of the building at the chairlift bottom station in Scheffau
1977	Amalgamation to create the greater ski area "Wilder Kaiser - Brixental", and first sales of all tickets, from single to season tickets, for the greater ski area, without offsetting
Construction of the new "Brandstadl" mountain restaurant in Scheffau
1978	Seal of approval for slope quality is awarded
Construction of the "Grundried" drag lift

1980-1990

1980	Construction of the "Ostlift II", Construction of the "Eiberglift II" in Scheffau

1982	Construction of the "Windauberg" and "Gampenkogel" drag lifts in Westendorf
Construction of the "Muldenlift" in Scheffau

1984	Construction of the "Brandstadlbahn" gondola in Scheffau

1985	Conclusion of a pooling agreement with ride offsetting between the villages of Brixen im Thale, Hopfgarten, Itter, Söll, Scheffau, Ellmau, Going and Westendorf (had just joined the greater ski area). 10% share agreed on.
Installation of readers and ticket counters for SkiWelt billing in Scheffau
Construction of the "Pendelbahn" lift and "Silleralm" three-seater chairlift in Söll
With the construction of the Silleralm hut, the installation of the "Filzboden" drag lift provided a direct connection from Söll to Scheffau via Brixen

1986	Construction of the Hochbrixen gondola in Brixen
Operation of the "Itter – Kraftalm" double chair lift and the "Kasbichl" double chair lift in Itter
Due to a lack of snow in the winters of the 1980s, SkiWelt Wilder Kaiser - Brixental acquired its first snowmaking equipment

1987	Installation of the first snowmaking system in Brixen
Construction of the first "bubble" - the four-seater chairlift on the Zinsberg in Brixen
Construction of the "Alpenrosenbahn", a 6-seater monocable gondola in two sections in Westendorf
Construction of the "Hochalmlift" in Scheffau

1988	Construction of the "Söll-Hochsöll" gondola, the "Stöckl" 4-seater chairlift and the "Salvenmoos" double chair in Söll
Construction of the "Aualmbahn" lift, Construction of the "Osthangbahn" lift, Construction of the new "Ostlift" in Scheffau

1989	Installation of the snowmaking system on the valley run in Ellmau
Construction of the "Taklaser" 4-seater chairlift (replacing the drag lift) in Westendorf
Installation of the snowmaking system in Hochsöll and purchase of the first diesel snow cannon
Inauguration of the "Salvista gondola" in Itter and 40th anniversary celebration of the Hohe Salve Lift Company.

1990-2000

1990	Name of the greater ski area changed from Wilder Kaiser-Brixental to SkiWelt Wilder Kaiser-Brixental
First snowmaking system at Stöckl – Salvenmoos – Rinner, supplied by the Stampfangerbach stream and purchase of 6 Crystal snow cannons in Hopfgarten

1991	Construction of the "Eibergbahn I + II" lift in Scheffau

1991/95	Installation of the snowmaking system in Westendorf

1992	Construction of the reservoir and installation of the snowmaking system in Scheffau

1993	Construction of the mid boarding point for the "Fleiding" three-seater lift in Westendorf

1994/95	The Scheffau Lift Company acquires an interest in the Brixen-im-Thale Lift Company

1995	Construction of the "Keat" detachable 4-seater chairlift and "Rinner" 4-seater chairlift in Söll
"Keat - Grundried" snowmaking system and purchase of 15 fully automatic snow cannons in Söll
Construction of the "Jochbahn" lift in Brixen

1996	Valley run snowmaking up to the mountain in Scheffau

1997	Introduction of a Kitzbühel Alps 6-day pass with offsetting for approx. 260 lifts 
Merger of "Goinger und Ellmauer GmbH" into "Sportcenter Ellmau-Going GmbH"
Installation of the snowmaking system for Silleralm – Antlasseealm – Angeralm valley run in Söll
Construction of the Lechen and Inner-Keat reservoirs in Söll
Construction of the "Muldenbahn" lift in Scheffau
Construction of the "Kälbersalvbahn" lift in Brixen

1998	Construction of the "Kreuzjöchl" reservoir in Westendorf and expansion of the snowmaking system
Construction of the "Südhangbahn" lift, snowmaking on remaining valley run. Construction of the Kaiserland building in Scheffau

1999	First reservoir on the Hartkaiser with pumping station for the snowmaking systems in Ellmau
Founding of the tourist board "Wilder Kaiser-Brixental Tourismus GmbH" by the tourist associations and ski lift companies of the SkiWelt Wilder Kaiser-Brixental. The tourist board (Tourismus GmbH) looks after the marketing agendas of its shareholders.

2000 - 2010

2000	Construction of the Hohe Salve gondola in Söll
Installation of the "Grundried – Hohe Salve – Rigi" snowmaking system in Söll
Construction of the "Köglbahn" 6-seater chairlift in Ellmau
Construction of the "Foisching" 8-seater chairlift in Hopfgarten
Renovation of the Free Flow mountain restaurant and raising of the reservoir in Scheffau

2001	Replacement of the "Windauberg" and "Gampenkogel" drag lifts with modern 4-seater chairlifts in Westendorf

2002	Construction of the "Brandstadl" 8-seater monocable gondola, bottom lift station and parking deck (buffet conversion, Sternbar) in Scheffau
Construction of the Filzalmsee reservoir in Brixen

2003	Replacement of the "Schneeberg I + II" drag lifts with a 4-seater chairlift with child safety bars in Westendorf
Construction of the "Kaiserexpress" 4-seater chairlift in Ellmau
Construction of the "Filzbodenbahn" lift in Brixen

2004	Construction of the "Hexen6er" detachable 6-seater chairlift in Ellmau
Construction of the "KaiserWelt" play area (playground at the Brandstadl mountain restaurant and in the forest) in Scheffau

2005	Construction of the "KiWest" 8-seater monocable gondola and a ski run with snowmaking to Aschau, connection to the Kitzbühel ski area
Construction of the "Kummereralmbahn" 6-person detachable chairlift and snowmaking on the slope in Scheffau

2006	Construction of the "Tanzboden" 6-seater chairlift in Ellmau and opening of the Mountain Theme Park "Ellmi's Zauberwelt".
Opening of the Kaiser shop on the Brandstadl, village snowmaking system (cross country track) in Scheffau

2007	Construction of the Salvensee reservoir in Hopfgarten
Installation go the snowmaking system for the "Hexenritt" toboggan run in Söll

2008	Construction of the "Choralmbahn" 8-seater monocable gondola in Westendorf
Construction of the "SkiWeltbahn" 8-seater monocable gondola in Westendorf
Construction of the "Salvenbahn II" 8-seater monocable gondola in Hopfgarten
Construction of the "Siller – Keat" 6-seater chairlift in Söll
Modification of the "Hartkaiserbahn" lift in Ellmau (controls)
Summer expansion of the Jochstube reservoir from 70,000 m³ to 180,000 m³ in Scheffau
Construction of the "Skiweltbahn" lift with snowmaking above the Kandleralm in Brixen

2009	Construction of the 6-seater chairlift, "Ellmi's 6er", and the Tanzboden reservoir with pumping station in Ellmau
Construction of the Choralmbahn at SkiWelt Westendorf
Construction of the Choralmbahn at SkiWelt Westendorf
Construction of the Salvenbahn II at SkiWelt Hopfgarten
Construction of the Salvenbahn II at SkiWelt Hopfgarten

2010-2011

2010	Construction of the "Osthangbahn" – detachable 8-seater chairlift with child safety bars, heated seats and lifting platform in Scheffau.

2011	New Moon toboggan run in Söll – open nights only – length 3.5 km
Expansion of the Astberg reservoir in Going and new platter lift on the nursery slope
Expansion of the Hopfgarten valley run (no. 20)
SkiMovie route on the Südhang slope in Scheffau
Free WiFi on SkiWelt mountains
Construction of the "Osthangbahn" at SkiWelt Brixen

2012-2022

2021   SkiWelt Wilder Kaiser-Brixental and KitzSki will be offering the toughest skiers a new challenge from this winter: the longest ski circuit (85 km.) in the world will connect the SkiWelt with the KitzSki ski area.

Ski Resorts

Brixen im Thale
The Sonnberg Chairlift was extended up to found the Sonnberg area of the resort in 1970. In 1986, a new Gondola lift was built as a replacement for this chairlift. In 1995, the company was transformed into a stock company. The main shareholders are: Bergbahnnen Sheffau GmbH & Co. (85.28%) and the Schilifte (ski lift operators). They have 60 employees in the winter season.

Ellmau-Going
The roots of the Ellmau area of this resort can be traced back to the setting up of the one-seater chairlift, Sessellift Postbauer, which had 4 ski runs and a toboggan run attached to it. Then, in 1970, Bergbahnnen Ellmau mbH was founded to pursue winter sports facilities in the town. They constructed the Hartkaiser cable railway. This has since been replaced with a 10-seater gondola. They joined the Wilder Kaiser-Brixental ski area in 1985.

In 1998, Bergbahnnen Ellmau mbH merged with Bergbahnnen Going mbH, and renamed themselves Bergbahnnen Ellmau-Going GmbH & Co. Hartkaiserbahn KG.

Hochsöll
A GmbH was first established in 1959, and they built a drag lift. Today, 2 gondolas stretch from Söll to the Hohe Salve. The Hochsöll area also has the Skiwelt's largest night-skiing area, fully floodlit skiing can occur after 5pm.

Hopfgarten - Itter - Kelchsau
In 1946 a Ges.mbH was registered in Hopfgarten to build a chairlift. They succeeded in 1949, building the third, and longest ropeway in Tirol.

In 1985, Bergbahnnen Hopfgarten merged with Schilifte Itter by the ratio 72:28, reflecting the pistes and lifts owned. In 1991, the company acquired Schilifte Kelchsau, and then, in 1997 declared bankruptcy. In 2008, they went into the red again, only to be saved by 200 shareholders. This was indirectly linked to the development of the Salvenbahn II gondola lift that stretched up to the Hohe Salve.

Kelchsau is only connected by skibus to the rest of the SkiWelt.

Scheffau
Bergbahnnen Scheffau GmbH & Co. KG was founded in 1962. They operate mostly as a link between the Ellmau-Going area in the east, and Brixental or Hochsöll in the west. They have an annual turnover of somewhere in the region of EUR 11 million. A lot of the major Skiwelt constructions have happened in the Scheffau area, or to connect the Scheffau area up with the rest of the Skiwelt. Some examples include: The new Alumbahn (Scheffau) - an 8-seater, heated and covered chairlift, The new Jochbahn (Brixental) - another 8 seater, heated and covered chairlift and the Siller-KEAT (Hochsöll) - A 6-seater covered chairlift.

In the summer season, there is a themed adventure park for kids situated between the exit to the Brandstadlbahn and the Gasthof Brandstadl.

Westendorf
The ski lift company was founded in 1946. Their first chairlift ran from the valley, near the village to the "Alpenrosenhütte on the Choralpe" on Mt. Nachtsöllberg. At over 2 km long, it was the longest chairlift in Austria at the time. A second (3 seater) chairlift was built 1969, with a middle-station.

Pictures

References

Ski areas and resorts in Austria